Trieste mia!, alternately titled Trieste del mio cuore, is a 1951 Italian war melodrama film directed by Mario Costa.

Cast 
 Aldo Silvani as Giovanni
 Milly Vitale as Anna
 Luciano Taioli as Luciano  	
 Ermanno Randi as Alberto 
 Mirko Ellis as Karl 
 Dante Maggio  
 Saro Urzì  
 Nando Bruno

External links
 

1951 films
1950s Italian-language films
Films set in Trieste
Italian war drama films
1950s war drama films
Melodrama films
Italian black-and-white films
Films directed by Mario Costa
1950s Italian films